The 1996 Victorian state election, held on Saturday, 30 March 1996, was for the 53rd Parliament of Victoria. It was held in the Australian state of Victoria to elect all 88 members of the state's Legislative Assembly and 22 members of the 44-member Legislative Council. The election took place four weeks after the 1996 federal election which swept the Labor Party from power nationally.

The Liberal–National Coalition led by Jeff Kennett and Pat McNamara was returned for a second term. A swing against the government did not produce a significant seat transfer to the Labor Party, now led by John Brumby and still recovering from its landslide defeat at the October 1992 state election. While Labor obtained significant swings in safe Coalition seats, the marginal outer suburban electorates swung further towards the government. The overall two party preferred swing was 2.8% to Labor.

The first signs of rural discontent with the Kennett government began to appear at this election. Independent candidate Russell Savage won Mildura from the Liberals, while other independents polled strongly in the Coalition-held electorates of Benalla, Gippsland East, Polwarth and Rodney.

Results

Legislative Assembly

|}

Legislative Council

|}

Seats changing hands

Key dates

See also
 Candidates of the 1996 Victorian state election
 Members of the Victorian Legislative Assembly, 1992–1996
 Members of the Victorian Legislative Assembly, 1996–1999

References

Elections in Victoria (Australia)
1996 elections in Australia
1990s in Victoria (Australia)
March 1996 events in Australia